In electronics, complex gain is the effect that circuitry has on the amplitude and phase of a sine wave signal. The term complex is used because mathematically this effect can be expressed as a complex number.

LTI systems
Considering the general LTI system

In case that , a particular solution to given equation is

Consider the following concepts used in physics and signal processing mainly.

This has the same units as the input quantity.
It has units of radian/time. Often we will be casual and refer to it as frequency, even though technically frequency should have units of cycles/time.

This has the same units as the response quantity. 
The gain is the factor that the input amplitude is multiplied by to get the amplitude of the response. It has the units needed to convert
input units to output units.
The phase lag has units of radians, i.e. it’s dimensionless.
This has units of time. It is the time that peak of the output lags behind that of the input.
This is the factor that the complex input is multiplied by to get the complex output.

Example
Suppose a circuit has an input voltage described by the equation

where ω equals 2π×100 Hz, i.e., the input signal is a 100 Hz sine wave with an amplitude of 1 volt.

If the circuit is such that for this frequency it doubles the signal's amplitude and causes a 90 degrees forward phase shift, then its output signal can be described by

In complex notation, these signals can be described as, for this frequency, j·1 V and 2 V, respectively.

The complex gain G of this circuit is then computed by dividing output by input:

This (unitless) complex number incorporates both the magnitude of the change in amplitude (as the absolute value) and the phase change (as the argument).

Electrical parameters